The Victoria Works is a Grade II listed building in the Jewellery Quarter of Birmingham, England. It was built in 1839–40 for Joseph Gillott, who manufactured pen nibs, and was one of the first purpose-built factories in the Jewellery Quarter. It is situated opposite the Argent Centre, another building constructed for industrial use around the same period.  The factory was one of the largest of its kind, with nearly 600 workers. Steam engines of 60 horsepower powered the mass production of the nibs.

Current use 
The Victoria Works was renovated in the early 1990s and houses a mixture of different companies and residents.

References

Further reading
 

Grade II listed buildings in Birmingham
Manufacturing plants in England
Grade II listed industrial buildings
Buildings and structures completed in 1840